From the Attic is the major label debut of rock band Damone.  This album is currently only available from digital outlets such as iTunes.

Track listing
All songs written by David Pino.
 Frustrated Unnoticed
 Your Girlfriends
Up to You
Feel Bad Vibe
Overchay with Me
On My Mind
Carwash Romance
Driveway Blues
At the Mall
You and I
Leave Me Alone

Personnel
Dustin Hengst - Drums
Noelle Leblanc - Lead vocals, rhythm guitar
David J. Pino - Lead guitar
Vazquez - Bass, backing vocals
Ducky Carlisle - Producer, engineer
Adam Rourke - Producer, engineer
Rob Gil - Assistant engineer
Jim Foster - Additional engineering
Tom Lord-Alge - Mixer
Femio Hernandez - Assistant Mixer

References

2003 debut albums
Damone (band) albums